This article shows the rosters of all participating teams at the men's softball tournament at the 2015 Pan American Games in Toronto. Rosters could have a maximum of 15 athletes.

The Argentine softball men's team that will compete at the 2015 Pan American Games:

Mauricio Caceres
Santiago Carril
Sebastian Gervasutti
Gustavo Godoy
Roman Godoy
Manuel Godoy
Juan Malarczuk
Huemul Mata
Teo Migliavacca
Mariano Montero
Pablo Montero
Bruno Motroni
Fernando Petric
Juan Potolicchio
Juan Zara

Canada announced their squad on June 11, 2015.

Ryan Boland
Sean Cleary
Jeff Ellsworth
Brad Ezekiel
Ian Fehrman
Jason Hill
Brandon Horn
Paul Koert
Derek Mayson
Steve Mullaley
Mathieu Roy
Jason Sanford
Kevin Schellenberg
Andy Skelton
Ryan Wolfe

The Dominican Republic was represented by the following athletes:

Randy Álvarez
Melvin Batista
José Bueno
Melvin Cruz
Julio Díaz
Santiago Díaz
Pablo Figuereo
Sergio la Hoz
Luis Martínez
Freddy Moreta
Juan Núñez
Yennier Pérez
Wilton Robles
Stalin Rosario
Engel Santana



The United States men's team roster.

Kris Bogach
Freddy Carmona
Kevin Castillo
Nate Devine
Josh Johnson
Tony Mancha
Chris Miljavac
Gerald Muizelaar
Nick Mullins
Matt Palazzo
Bobby Rosthenhausler
Pat Sagdal
Rylan Sandoval
Chase Turner
Derrick Zechman

Venezuela's roster consisted of 15 athletes.

Arturo Acacio
Yeider Chirinos
Joan Colombo
Rafael Flores
Pedro Gonzalez
Ramon Jones
Jorge Lima
Edwin Linares
Tulio Linares
Iran Paez
Luiger Pinto
Kerlis Rivero
Rogelio Sequera
Erick Urbaneja
John Zambrano

References

Softball at the 2015 Pan American Games
Softball squads